Raoul of Goldenlake is a fictional character in many of author Tamora Pierce's writings. He first appears in her Song of the Lioness quartet and is also a major character in the Protector of the Small series.

Role in Song of the Lioness
Raoul is first introduced as a page in Pierce's Tortall universe as one of Jonathan of Conté's group of friends. He soon becomes close friends with Alan of Trebond, who is later revealed to be Alanna of Trebond. In the period in which Alan was being bullied by Ralon of Malven, Raoul would almost always retaliate and defend his small friend.

Role in Protector of the Small
In the Protector of the Small series he is reintroduced as Raoul of Goldenlake and Malorie's Peak, a famous figure in Tortall and Knight Commander of the King's Own. Described as mild-tempered and kind, he is nonetheless a formidable opponent in combat. His nickname, "Giantkiller," comes from his having killed one giant single-handedly before the beginning of the series and another in the 3rd installment, Squire. It is also in Squire that he becomes the female protagonist Keladry of Mindelan's knight master. While conservatives of the realm disapprove of women in combat and often raise rumors of ulterior motives for his selection of squire, Raoul is described as a mentor and father figure to Kel. He encourages her to bring out her full potential in both arms and command and is one of her biggest supporters. This support is shown in Lady Knight when he sends a squad of soldiers to support her in crossing enemy territory to illegally retrieve captured refugees Kel had been assigned to protect. He is also one of the group awaiting her when she returns to Tortallan territory.
Raoul later marries Buriram Tourakom, commander of the Queen's Riders.

External links
Official Site
Works by Tamora Pierce

Literary characters introduced in 1983
Characters in American novels of the 20th century